Robert Gerhart Jr. (born July 21, 1958) is an American retired professional stock car racing driver and businessman. He last competed in the ARCA Menards Series, driving Chevrolet SS for Gerhart Racing and the No. 63 Chevy Silverado for his own team in a joint effort with the MB Motorsports team in the Camping World Truck Series. He has won nine times on the ARCA circuit, eight of those victories coming in the season-opening ARCA Daytona 200 at Daytona International Speedway (2012, 2011, 2010, 2007, 2006, 2005, 2002 and 1999).

Racing career

Early racing career
Gerhart began racing at Linda's Speedway, where he won his first feature race. He eventually competed in many dirt modified series throughout his home state of Pennsylvania, often competing at Penn National and Susquehanna Speedway. He eventually moved to asphalt racing and competed at Pocono Raceway.

ARCA Menards Series

In 1988, Gerhart began competing in the ARCA Series and was named Rookie of the Year that season. He has competed in that series on a regular basis since then, returning to NASCAR in 1996 to drive in the Craftsman Truck Series. He and his No. 85 Chevrolet Silverado qualified three times and had a best finish of 15th. He returned to Cup in 1998 attempting to qualify the No. 54 and eventually the No. 89 Chevrolet after picking up sponsorship from Kewadin Casinos. He was unable to qualify for those three attempts, but was able to win the season-opening ARCA race at Daytona in 1999, and went on to finish 3rd in points that year.

Since that time, Gerhart has competed in a mostly limited schedule in ARCA. The lone exception was the 2006 season where he ran full-time and finished second in points. From 2005–2007 and again in 2010-12, he won the season opening race at Daytona.

NASCAR
He made his NASCAR debut in 1983 at Pocono, finishing thirty-eighth in the Henley Gray-owned Buick. He ran Winston Cup races at Pocono, Dover International Speedway, North Wilkesboro Speedway, Michigan International Speedway, and Daytona International Speedway over the next five years in the #71, #85, #25, and #59 Chevrolets with a best finish of 19th.

He made his first starts in the NASCAR Busch Series in 2001, driving four times in his #65 and having a best finish of 22nd. In 2009, Gerhart returned again to NASCAR in the Nationwide Series to drive the #75 for Bob Schacht. At his first race at Talladega Superspeedway, he qualified fifth and ran in the top-twenty for most of the day before wrecking. In 2013, it was announced that Gerhart would attempt to qualify for the DRIVE4COPD 300 in a car owned by him and his brother William Gerhart, numbered 85. However, Gerhart failed to qualify. Gerhart ran a few Nationwide Series races later in the year.

He qualified for the 2014 DRIVE4COPD 300, finishing 33rd. Gerhart failed to qualify his first 2 attempts at Daytona and Talladega in his own 85 car. Gerhart was named as the driver of the JD Motorsports No. 0 Chevrolet Camaro replacing Harrison Rhodes in Chicagoland. Gerhart qualified for the July race in Daytona, finishing 22nd. In October, Gerhart made his first NASCAR Camping World Truck Series start since 1996 driving the 36 truck for MB Motorsports with sponsorship from long time partner Lucas Oil. Gerhart finished 12th after spending most of the race towards the front of the field. Gerhart plans to do the Daytona triple in 2016, running the ARCA race, the NASCAR Camping World Truck race, and the Xfinity Series race.

Personal life
Gerhart's brother Billy serves as his crew chief. Their father is former Eastern Modified champion Bobby Gerhart, Sr. Gerhart, Sr. began his racing career in Pennsylvania in 1954, and was inducted into the Eastern Motorsport Press Association Hall of Fame in 2002. Other family members in racing include Deacon Gerhart and Dave Gerhart. Gerhart owns Bobby Gerhart's Truck World, a used truck dealership in his hometown.

Prior to the start of the 2020 season, Gerhart suffered a heart attack, forcing him into retirement.

Motorsports career results

NASCAR
(key) (Bold – Pole position awarded by qualifying time. Italics – Pole position earned by points standings or practice time. * – Most laps led.)

Nextel Cup Series

Daytona 500

Xfinity Series

Gander Outdoors Truck Series

ARCA Menards Series
(key) (Bold – Pole position awarded by qualifying time. Italics – Pole position earned by points standings or practice time. * – Most laps led.)

 Season still in progress
 Ineligible for series points

References

External links
 
 

Living people
1958 births
People from Lebanon, Pennsylvania
Racing drivers from Pennsylvania
NASCAR drivers
ARCA Menards Series drivers